Diastella is a genus containing seven species of flowering plants, commonly known as “silkypuffs”, in the protea family. The name comes from the Greek diastellein “to separate”, with reference to the free perianth lobes – the plants are distinguished from the closely related and similar leucospermums by the possession of four free perianth segments. The genus is endemic to the Cape Floristic Region of South Africa where it has a very limited range and is associated with fynbos habitats. The species are all small shrubs. Most species are threatened.

Species
Described species and subspecies are listed below, with their conservation status:

 Diastella buekii (Gand.) Rourke – Franschhoek silkypuff – CR
 Diastella divaricata  (P.J.Bergius) Rourke
 Diastella divaricata subsp. divaricata – Peninsula silkypuff – Rare
 Diastella divaricata subsp. montana Rourke – Mountain silkypuff – VU
 Diastella fraterna  Rourke – Palmiet silkypuff – Rare
 Diastella myrtifolia  (Thunb.) Salisb. ex Knight – Tulbagh silkypuff – CR
 Diastella parilis  Salisb. ex Knight – Worcester silkypuff – CR
 Diastella proteoides  (L.) Druce – Flats silkypuff – CR
 Diastella thymelaeoides  (P.J.Bergius) Rourke
 Diastella thymelaeoides subsp. thymelaeoides – Steenbras silkypuff – NT
 Diastella thymelaeoides subsp. meridiana Rourke – Hangklip Silkypuff – VU

References

 
Proteaceae genera
Endemic flora of South Africa
Flora of the Cape Provinces